Firougou or Finougou is a commune in the Andemtenga Department of Kouritenga Province in the Centre-Est region of Burkina Faso. It had a population of 1,429 in 2006.

Demographics

Neighbourhoods

References 

Populated places in the Centre-Est Region